The Paddys River Falls, sometimes also Paddy's River Falls, is a cascade waterfall located on the Paddys River, situated approximately  south of Tumbarumba, in the eastern Riverina region of New South Wales, Australia.

Adjacent to the falls on the Tumbarumba to Tooma Road is a barbecue and picnic area situated above the falls. A staired  track from the picnic area leads to the base of the falls.

See also

List of waterfalls of New South Wales

References

Waterfalls of New South Wales
Riverina
Cascade waterfalls